Vladimir Ivanovich Arzamaskov (7 April 1951 – 30 November 1985) was a former Soviet (Russian) basketball player who competed for the Soviet Union in the 1976 Summer Olympics.

Titles 
 FIBA European Cup Winners' Cup: (2) (with Spartak Leningrad: 1972–73, 1974–75)
 USSR League: (3) (with Spartak Leningrad: 1974–75 & CSKA Moscow: 1977–78, 1978–79)

References

External links 

1951 births
1985 deaths
Basketball players at the 1976 Summer Olympics
Medalists at the 1976 Summer Olympics
Olympic basketball players of the Soviet Union
Olympic bronze medalists for the Soviet Union
Olympic medalists in basketball
Soviet men's basketball players
BC Spartak Saint Petersburg players